Boneh-ye Khater (also Romanized as Boneh-ye Khāţer and Boneh Khāţer) is a village in Howmeh Rural District, in the Central District of Deylam County, Bushehr Province, Iran. At the 2006 census, its population was 214, in 46 families.

References 

Populated places in Deylam County